The 1987 European Figure Skating Championships was a senior-level international competition held in Sarajevo, Yugoslavia (present-day Bosnia and Herzegovina) on February 3–8, 1987. Elite skaters from European ISU member nations competed in the disciplines of men's singles, ladies' singles, pair skating, and ice dancing.

Results

Men

Ladies

Pairs

Ice dancing

References

External links
 results

Sources
 ISU Results book vol.II p 222-226

1987 in figure skating
1987 in Yugoslav sport
1987
International figure skating competitions hosted by Yugoslavia
Sports competitions in Sarajevo
1987 European Figure Skating Championships
1987 in Bosnia and Herzegovina
February 1987 sports events in Europe